A dianion is an anion with a net charge of –2.

The most heavily studied atomic dianion is H, usually as a short-lived resonance between an electron and a hydrogen ion. In 1976, its half-life was experimentally measured to be 23 ± 4 nanoseconds.

See also 

 Dication

References 

Anions